"Mapa" (a portmanteau of mama and papa; stylized in all uppercase) is a song recorded by Filipino boy band SB19, released on May 16, 2021, by Sony Music, as the second pre-release digital single off their extended play Pagsibol. The song was written by the band's leader Pablo, who also co-produced the song, together with Jay Durias of South Border and by Simon Servida, who also serves as the personnel behind the band's previous single "What?". The song was released between Mother's Day and Father's Day as a tribute to all parents. It has placed fifth on Google's most searched songs globally in 2021.

Recording 
Even before the pandemic happened and during their concert tour, SB19 had lesser time to be with their families which prompted the group to record a pop song for their parents. Pablo quoted in a press conference as saying that "We released this song to show gratitude and appreciation for [our parents for] helping us survive all the challenges and difficulties that we’ve encountered growing up". The songwriting was initiated through a Q&A with each of the members by asking what they would like to say to their parents. The song's production was mostly done virtually with the co-producer, Simon Servida, and Pablo communicating only via Instagram.

Composition and lyrics 
"Mapa" has been described as "rousing ballad" synonymous to a "Japanese ballad that can be very well used as a closing song for an anime series". GMA News called it a soulful ballad similar to "Tilaluha" and "Hanggang Sa Huli". The melody was inspired from a lullaby that Pablo's mother would sing to him when he was a child. In terms of music notation, the song is composed in the key of A major, when it last chorus is B-flat major with a tempo of 130 beats per minute, and has a length of 4:35.

Before the release, a brief snippet of the lyrics "La-ta-ra-ta-ra, la-ta-ra-ta-ra" sung by Pablo was revealed at the end of the logo trailer. Lyrically, the song title is a combination of the Tagalog words "mama" and "papa" and the lyrics are described as "heart-wrenching" and "incredibly moving". Pablo wrote the lyrics to "inspire people to be appreciative of everything that our parents did for us and to give back" and an implication that parents serve as guidance and direction in life. Daily Tribune described that the lyrics evoked the representation of son and parents "in tight embrace" which depicted to be a "love letter" to mothers and fathers.

Release and promotion 
Two months after the release of "What?", SB19 in an interview spoiled the release of their next single would be in May. On May 3, 2021, they posted on their social media about the new song with the information of the release date. Four days later, the title of the song "Mapa" was revealed to the public. A scheduler was shared that started with SB19 sharing a letter to their parents on the first day while the fans' turn on the next day. The logo for the song represented by a compass with a paper airplane was revealed through a 19-minute video trailer posted on YouTube. On the next five days, they posted lyric cards accompanied by a Twitter "mention party" with each band members. "Mapa" was sent to digital streaming and download platforms on May 16, 2021, complemented with a lyric video. The song was performed for the first time through a music showcase broadcast on Facebook and YouTube.

Commercial use
On May 23, 2021, it was performed on national television on ASAP. A making film was uploaded on YouTube a week after release of the band version. In November 2021, this song was used as a jingle for Purefoods' omnibus Christmas ad with altered lyrics and a different arrangement.

In 2022, this song was used as part of a weekly task by the teen housemates in Pinoy Big Brother: Kumunity Season 10, where SB19 performed alongside the teen housemates in their final performance.

Band version 

A full-band rendition of the song was released on June 27, 2021, through Sony Music. It was recorded by SB19 and Filipino folk-pop band Ben&Ben, and produced by SB19, Ben&Ben, and Mark Villar. It marks the first collaboration between SB19 and Ben&Ben. The performance video was shot at the reopened art deco-inspired Manila Metropolitan Theatre after six years of restoration.

Recording and composition 
According to their label, SB19 had the idea to do a band version of the song with Ben&Ben. Having admiration for each other, both groups agreed immediately to the idea of collaboration. They released concept photos, depicting members of both groups on sets with old furniture and books, throughout before the release as teasers.

Ben&Ben were mainly involved with the process having complete musical and creative freedom to arrange the song, only giving comments to improve some parts. Pablo and Ben&Ben keyboardist Pat Lasaten were directly coordinating and constantly giving updates. The main arrangements were mainly conceptualized by Lasaten and fellow electric guitarist member Poch Barreto. The label manager quoted that "Arrangement-wise, we wanted to make it distinct from the original, adding fun rhythms and grand sections. We felt that doing this added weight, and served to support the powerful vocal performance of both acts."

The new version of "Mapa" was filled with jazzy sound, orchestral details, "inviting harmonies", and expansive arrangements. Pablo described it as a "rich and happy kind of vibe" song compared to the original version which is "more mellow".

Credits and personnel 
Credits adapted from Tidal, lyric video and official video.
 SB19 – performer, producer, primary vocals
Ben&Ben – performer, arrangement, producer (Band version only)
 John Paulo Nase – composer, producer, songwriting
 Jay Durias – producer, piano
 Simon Servida – producer
 Hyun Jeong Jo – mastering and mixing
Glendford Lumbao – cover art design
Mark Villar – producer, mixing and mastering (Band version only)
Poch Barretto – arrangement (Band version only)
Patricia Lasaten – arrangement (Band version only)
Jean-Paul Verona – producer (Band version only)
Sam Marquez – assistant sound engineer (Band version only)
Richard Garcia – live sound engineer (Band version only)

References 

SB19 songs
2021 songs
2021 singles
2020s ballads
Tagalog-language songs
Sony Music singles